Luis Miguel "Chapulín" Díaz Castell (born 1 December 1977, in Mexico City) is a Mexican racing driver who competes in the American Le Mans Series for Level 5 Motorsports. He won the 2009 American Le Mans Series LMP2 class drivers championship alongside team owner Adrián Fernández, and was runner-up in the 2005 and 2006 Rolex Sports Car Series DP drivers championship. Díaz also has an extensive open-wheel racing background.

Early racing career
Starting off in karting in 1989, Diaz was National Kart Champion in the A category and a two-time champion in the Super 100cc category. He earned Rookie of the Year honors in 1996 in Formula Reynard before moving up to Formula 3 International in 1997, where he was the highest-placed Mexican driver in the series that year.

Diaz earned the Formula Mexico title in 1998, followed by a season in the Panamerican Indy Lights, where he was also Rookie of the Year and the first Mexican driver to win a race in that series.

Indy Lights
Díaz made his Indy Lights debut in 1999, finishing 10th in his first race at Laguna Seca. One year later, he joined the GO-Quaker-Herdez team before transitioning to Roquin Motorsports in 2001, where he finished seventh in the championship with one podium and four top-five finishes to his credit.

Atlantic championship
Diaz was hired by Dorricot Racing in 2002 and competed in his first Formula Atlantic season, finishing fourth in the championship with wins at Portland and Road America.

The following year, he won the season-opening round at Monterrey en route to an eighth-place finish in the end-of-year championship. Diaz was awarded the Gilles Villeneuve trophy for his achievements that year.

Champ Car
Díaz made two Champ Car starts, both as a substitute driver at the Autodromo Hermanos Rodriguez circuit in Mexico City. He failed to finish both events.

Grand-Am
Making his sports car racing debut in 2004, Diaz teamed with Jimmy Morales in a Lexus-Riley Daytona Prototype for Chip Ganassi Racing in the Rolex Sports Car Series.

In 2005, Diaz moved to the team’s No. 01 entry with Scott Pruett, earning three wins, eight podium finishes and four poles en route to a runner-up finish in the Daytona Prototype drivers championship. He repeated the feat again in 2006 and helped lead Ganassi to the teams championship.

American Le Mans Series
Díaz made his American Le Mans Series debut in 2007, driving for Lowe’s Fernandez Racing in the LMP2 category with a Lola B06/43 Acura and later the Acura ARX-01a/b. He enjoyed a successful three-year stint with the team, culminating with the 2009 LMP2 Drivers Championship for he and Adrian Fernandez. That year, they scored nine wins out of ten races, with Diaz earning three class poles.

Following the demise of Fernandez Racing Diaz made a handful of starts for both Alex Job Racing and PR1/Mathiasen Motorsports in 2010, reaching the podium four times and earning three class poles in the GTC and PC ranks.

The 2011 season saw Diaz join Level 5 Motorsports for its P2 program. He kicked off the season with a class win in the 2011 12 Hours of Sebring with Scott Tucker and Ryan Hunter-Reay before earning additional victories at Road America and Laguna Seca. Diaz remained at Level 5 Motorsports for 2012, earning the P2 victory at Laguna Seca in the team's HPD ARX-03b.

In addition to his success on the track, Diaz is a two-time winner of the "Most Popular Driver" award.

24 Hours of Le Mans
Diaz made his Le Mans debut in 2012, co-driving with Scott Tucker and Christophe Bouchut in Level 5 Motorsports’ LMP2-class HPD ARX-03b. The car failed to finish after running out of fuel on-track.

Personal life
Díaz enjoys karting, golf, tennis, fitness, and Mini-Z RC Car Racing. His nickname is Chapulín (Grasshopper in English).

Racing record

Complete A1 Grand Prix results
(key) (Races in bold indicate pole position) (Races in italics indicate fastest lap)

Complete American open-wheel racing results
(key)

Indy Lights

Atlantic Championship

CART

Complete American Le Mans Series results

 * Season still in progress.

24 Hours of Le Mans results

References

External links
Luis Diaz Career Statistics

1977 births
Living people
A1 Team Mexico drivers
Indy Lights drivers
Mexican racing drivers
Racing drivers from Mexico City
Rolex Sports Car Series drivers
American Le Mans Series drivers
Mexican Formula Three Championship drivers
24 Hours of Daytona drivers
24 Hours of Le Mans drivers
Walker Racing drivers
A1 Grand Prix drivers
Level 5 Motorsports drivers
DAMS drivers
Chip Ganassi Racing drivers